Akuramboda is a village in Sri Lanka. It is located within Matale District, Central Province.

History
According to tradition, the first settler of the village was a bandāra from "Arakan" during the reign of an early Sinhalese king. A Buddhist vihāra in the village is said to have been built during the reign of the Sinhalese king Dutugamunu.

A government school was operating at the village in 1880 with 170 boys on the roll, 166 boys in 1887, and 168 in 1893.

Demographics

See also
List of towns in Central Province, Sri Lanka

References

External links

Populated places in Matale District